Prescott Prince (born November 15, 1954) is an American lawyer and officer in the United States Navy Reserve.
Prince is notable for being assigned to represent Guantanamo captive Khalid Sheikh Mohammed.

Education

Member of Kappa Alpha Order.

Legal career
Prince shifted from the regular Navy to the reserves in 1987 and graduated from Washington and Lee University School of Law, and had a civilian law practice in Richmond, Virginia until his recall to active duty in June 2007.
For the remainder of 2007 Prince served as a "rule of law officer" in Iraq.

In 2008 Prince was assigned Khalid Sheikh Mohammed as a client.

References

Guantanamo Bay attorneys
Davidson College alumni
Washington and Lee University School of Law alumni
Radford University alumni
1952 births
Living people